Sigurd Nilsson (January 11, 1910 – February 12, 1972) was a Swedish cross-country skier who competed in the 1930s. He won a bronze medal in the 4 × 10 km relay at the 1938 FIS Nordic World Ski Championships in Lahti.

Cross-country skiing results

World Championships
 1 medal – (1 bronze)

External links
World Championship results 

1910 births
1972 deaths
Swedish male cross-country skiers
FIS Nordic World Ski Championships medalists in cross-country skiing